Rowdy Lewayne Williams (born August 28, 1969), better known as Ganxsta NIP (pronounced Gangsta Nip), is a rapper from South Park, Houston, Texas and a member of the South Park Coalition, which he co-founded in 1987 with Houston rapper K-Rino. In 1992 he released his debut album South Park Psycho. This record also helped put the South Park Coalition name on the map due to world wide distribution from Rap-a-Lot. He also wrote the Geto Boys hit "Chuckie". NIP stands for "Nation of Islam Is Powerful"; he is also a part of the Nation of Islam. Williams is also looked at as one of the creators of the horrorcore rap genre.

Biography
Ganxsta NIP's first album The South Park Psycho was released in 1992. There was no single to promote the album but it charted at #63 on the Top R&B/Hip-Hop Albums and sold almost 100,000 copies in the area to land him a deal with Priority Records. His second solo album Psychic Thoughts (Are What I Conceive) charted on the Billboard 200 at #151, at #30 on the Top R&B/Hip-Hop Albums and at #5 on the Top Heatseekers. His style of rap was hardcore gangsta rap with gory lyrical content, which is called horrorcore.

After his 2003 album The Return!!! (of the Psychopath) NIP took a break before making a comeback with Still Psycho five years later. Ganxsta NIP’s most recent album, Psych' Swag: Da Horror Movie, consists of 14 songs and was released on the artist's own record label Psych Ward Entertainment.

Discography

Studio albums
1992: The South Park Psycho
1993: Psychic Thoughts (Are What I Conceive?)
1996: Psychotic Genius
1998: Interview with a Killa
1999: Psycho Thug
2003: The Return!!! (of the Psychopath)
2008: Still Psycho
2010: Psych' Swag: Da Horror Movie
2012: H-Town Legend: Still Gettin It In
2014: God of Horrorcore Rap
2016: Street Messiah (as Brother N.I.P)
2017: Souljaz Only (as Brother NIP)
2018: Creator of Horrorcore
2019: Conversation with the Gangstas (as Brother NIP)
2020: The Great Adventures of NIP Turner (as Brother NIP)

Other albums
2003: Originator of the Psycho Sound

With South Park Coalition
2003: Packin' Heat
2004: Family Bizness
2006: Personal Vendetta

Guest appearances

References

1969 births
Living people
African-American male rappers
Horrorcore artists
Rappers from Houston
Gangsta rappers
21st-century American rappers
21st-century American male musicians
21st-century African-American musicians
20th-century African-American people